In Christian theology, universal reconciliation (also called universal salvation, Christian universalism, or in context simply universalism) is the doctrine that all sinful and alienated human souls—because of divine love and mercy—will ultimately be reconciled to God. The doctrine has been rejected by most mainstream Christian churches, which tend to maintain at least the possibility that many are not saved, but it has received support from many prestigious Christian thinkers as well as many groups of Christians. It has been argued that the Bible itself has a variety of verses that seem to support a plurality of views.

Universal salvation may be related to the perception of a problem of Hell, standing opposed to ideas such as endless conscious torment in Hell, but may also include a period of finite punishment similar to a state of purgatory. Believers in universal reconciliation may support the view that while there may be a real "Hell" of some kind, it is neither a place of endless suffering nor a place where the spirits of human beings are ultimately "annihilated" after enduring the just amount of divine retribution.

The concept of reconciliation is related to the concept of salvation—i.e., salvation from spiritual and eventually physical death—such that the term "universal salvation" is functionally equivalent. Universalists espouse various theological beliefs concerning the process or state of salvation, but all adhere to the view that salvation history concludes with the reconciliation of the entire human race to God. Many adherents assert that the suffering and crucifixion of Jesus Christ constitute the mechanism that provides redemption for all humanity and atonement for all sins.

Modern Unitarian Universalism emerged in part from the Universalist Church but, being a non-creedal faith, it holds no official doctrinal positions. Universal reconciliation, however, remains a popular viewpoint among many of its congregations and individual believers, including many who have not associated with the Universalist Church.

An alternative to universal reconciliation is the doctrine of annihilationism, often in combination with Christian conditionalism. Some Christian leaders, such as influential German theologian Martin Luther, have hypothesized other concepts such as "spiritual mortalism" or "soul death".

Biblical background

As David Fisher, a bishop and professor of philosophy has put it, "In the final analysis, the question of salvation is always an inquiry into the balancing of human free will with God's mercy and forgiveness." The Bible itself has, as referred to before, a variety of verses on the subject that appear to be contradictory if not given additional reader interpretation. Influential theologians Emil Brunner and J.A.T. Robinson argue that these verses can be put into two distinct categories: damnation for some or eventual reconciliation for all.

The traditional view held by Christian organized religion comes from a variety of Biblical citations. It is stated in John 3:36 (NIV), "Whoever believes in the Son has eternal life, but whoever rejects the Son will not see life, for God’s wrath remains on them." Also, 2 Thessalonians 1:8–9 (NIV) declares, "Those who do not know God and do not obey the gospel of our Lord Jesus, they will be punished with everlasting destruction and shut out from the presence of the Lord and from the glory of his might."

The Gospel of Luke statement by Jesus about salvation being a "narrow" doorway is often quoted, with Luke 13:23–25 reading:

Books of the Bible argued to possibly support the idea of full reconciliation include the First Epistle to the Corinthians. The sections of 1 Corinthians 15:22, "As all die in Adam, so all will be made alive in Christ", and 1 Corinthians 15:28, "God will be all in all", are cited. Verses that seem to contradict the tradition of complete damnation and come up in arguments also include Lamentations 3:31–33 (NIV), "For no one is cast off by the Lord forever. Though he brings grief, he will show compassion, so great is his unfailing love", and 1 Timothy 4:10 (NIV), "We have put our hope in the living God, who is the Savior of all people, and especially of those who believe."

As well, the Epistle to the Colossians receives attention, with Colossians 1:17–20 reading:

Development of universalist arguments
Broadly speaking, most historical advocates of Christian universalism throughout the years (and many now still) did so from the perspective of accepting the traditional Biblical canon as divinely inspired and without transcription error but rejecting strict Biblical literalism, practicing detailed exegesis of the texts. The advocates have argued that the apparent contradiction between Bible verses that describe God eventually reconciling humanity to goodness (such as in the Epistle to the Ephesians) with those that describe damnation to most of humanity (such as in the Book of Revelation) is that threats of long-term punishment function just as threats, not necessarily as predictions of future events, that will not be actually carried out. Advocates have also argued that suffering of sinners in hell or hell-like states will be long but still limited, not eternal.

However, liberal and progressive Christians have often argued that the teachings of the historical Jesus did not mention exclusive salvation for a select few and have altogether rejected many sections of the Bible written by figures decades after the life of Jesus as man-made inventions that are to be taken with a grain of salt.

While not being a universalist per se, influential Christian philosopher Karl Barth, often regarded as the greatest Protestant theologian of the twentieth century, spoke for a great deal of broadly traditional Christians when he wrote that salvation is centrally Christological. He asserted that in Jesus Christ, the reconciliation of all of mankind to God has essentially already taken place and that through Christ man is already elect and justified. Therefore, eternal salvation for everyone, even those that reject God, is a possibility that is more than an open question but should be hoped for by Christians as a matter of grace.

Responses
One recurrent objection to universalism made by many has been that having a deep-rooted belief in eternal torment as a possibility is a necessary deterrent from living an immoral life.

Universalists have often responded that punishments for sin can function well without being eternal, especially in the afterlife when one can face severe treatment first before one eventually gets to heaven.

History
In 1978, Biblical scholar Richard Bauckham offered an academic survey of the history of universal salvation. He outlined the history thus:

However, eternal punishment did not appear in official creeds until the pseudo-Athanasian Creed in the late 5th century, when all admit that endless hell's popularity was on the rise. Contrary to Bauckham, it is unknown which view (of endless hell, annihilation, or correctional hell) was most prevalent in the early Church. The doctrine of endless torment does not seem to have been as indispensable to Christian belief back then as, for example, the Trinity and Incarnation. That is shown by the early 5th century statements of St. Augustine of Hippo, a most formidable advocate of the endless hell view, who admitted that "very many" Christians saw hell as correctional and temporary and who considered his argument with them an "amicable controversy."  St. Jerome attested around the same time that "many" believed that even the devil "will repent and be restored to his former place."

Early Christianity
According to Edward Beecher and George T. Knight, in the first 600 years of Christian history there were six main theological schools on hell: four of them were universalist, one taught annihilationism and the last taught endless torment. Many early Church Fathers have been quoted as either embracing or hoping for the ultimate reconciliation of God with His creation.  The concept of a final restoration of all souls particularly had large appeal in the East during the fourth and fifth centuries.

Alexandria
The most important school of Universalist thought was the Didascalium in Alexandria, Egypt, which was founded by Saint Pantaenus in about 190. Alexandria was the centre of learning and intellectual discourse in the ancient Mediterranean world, and it was the theological centre of gravity of Christianity prior to the rise of the Roman Church.

Clement of Alexandria (c. 150 – c. 215)
The Universalists Hosea Ballou (1829), Thomas Whittemore (1830), John Wesley Hanson (1899) and George T. Knight (1911) claimed that Clement of Alexandria expressed universalist positions in early Christianity. Such claims have always been controversial. Some scholars believe that Clement used the term apocatastasis to refer primarily to the restoration of a select few, but with universal implications. Brian E. Daley writes that Clement viewed "punishment after death as a medicinal and therefore temporary measure" and that he suggested "with great caution the related prospect of universal salvation for all intelligent creatures", for example in his Stromateis, Book VII, Chapter 2.

Origen (c. 185 – 254)
According to Daley, Origen was firmly convinced that "all human souls will ultimately be saved" and "united to God forever in loving contemplation" and that this is "an indispensable part of the “end” promised by Paul in I Cor 15.24–28." Daley also notes that Origen sometimes called this final state of universal salvation ἀποκατάστασις and suggested it was already a familiar concept to his readers.

Fredrick W. Norris maintained, however, that Origen may not have strongly believed in universal reconciliation at all. In an article on apocatastasis in The Westminster handbook to Origen (2004) he wrote, "As far as we can tell, therefore, Origen never decided to stress exclusive salvation or universal salvation, to the strict exclusion of either case."

Gregory of Nyssa (c. 335 – 390s)
Gregory of Nyssa, who was declared "the father of fathers" by the Seventh Ecumenical Council, is interpreted by many scholars as a proponent of universal salvation

Gregory stated, "when death approaches to life, and darkness to light, and the corruptible to the incorruptible, the inferior is done away with and reduced to non-existence, and the thing purged is benefited, just as the dross is purged from gold by fire. In the same way in the long circuits of time, when the evil of nature which is now mingled and implanted in them has been taken away, whensoever the restoration to their old condition of the things that now lie in wickedness takes place, there will be a unanimous thanksgiving from the whole creation, both of those who have been punished in the purification and of those who have not at all needed purification."

6th century – Ecumenical condemnation of universalism?
Apocatastasis was interpreted by 19th-century Universalists such as Hosea Ballou (1842) to be the same as the beliefs of the Universalist Church of America. However, until the middle of the 6th century, the word had a broader meaning. While it applied to a number of doctrines regarding salvation, it also referred to a return to both a location and an original condition. Thus, the Greek word's application was originally broad and metaphorical. Many heteroclite views became associated with Origen, and the 15 anathemas against him attributed to the Second Council of Constantinople condemned a form of apocatastasis, along with the pre-existence of the soul, animism, a heterodox Christology, and a denial of real and lasting resurrection of the body. Some authorities believe that the anathemas belong to an earlier local synod.

The New Advent Catholic Encyclopedia claims that the Fifth Ecumenical Council was contested as being an official and authorized Ecumenical Council since it was established not by the Pope but the Emperor since the Pope resisted it. The Fifth Ecumenical Council addressed what was called "The Three Chapters" and was against a form of Origenism that had nothing to do with Origen and Origenist views. Popes Vigilius, Pelagius I (556–61), Pelagius II (579–90), and Gregory the Great (590–604) were aware only that the Fifth Council specifically dealt with the Three Chapters, and they neither mentioned Origenism or Universalism and nor spoke as if they knew of its condemnation even though Gregory the Great was opposed to the belief of universalism. Scholar Richard Bauckham stated that while universalism appeared "discredited" because of scholarly resistance to Origen's view, it "seems in doubt" if the Fifth Ecumenical Council specifically endorsed any negative view of it.

7th century – Isaac of Nineveh
The universal reconciliation was strongly advocated in the writings of St. Isaac the Syrian, a monastic theologian and bishop of Nineveh.

Middle Ages
The Universalist John Wesley Hanson stated that even after eternal hell became the normative position of the Church, there were still some Christian thinkers during the Middle Ages who embraced Universalist ideas. In his Schaff article George T. Knight stated that "maybe" Johannes Scotus Eriugena, Johannes Tauler, Blessed John of Ruysbroeck and Blessed Julian of Norwich had Universalist leanings.

Solomon of Akhlat, a thirteenth-century bishop of the Church of the East, defended universalism in his Book of the Bee, mostly basing himself on citations of Isaac of Nineveh, Theodore of Mopsuestia, and Diodorus of Tarsus. David Bentley Hart confirms this and adds that Timotheus II, a fourteenth-century patriarch of the said church, "thought it uncontroversial to assert that the aiōnios pains of hell will come to an end when the souls cleansed by them, through the prayers of the saints, enter paradise."

16th century – Reformation era
Although figures such as Erasmus rekindled interests in the Greek Church Fathers, and early advocates of universal salvation, such as Origen, became more broadly known as new editions of their writings were published, the universal restoration was not a doctrine that mainstream Reformers wished to restore. Nonetheless, even as the Augsburg Confession promulgates endless torment, it suggests that at least some Anabaptists held to universalism: "They condemn the Anabaptists, who think that there will be an end to the punishments of condemned men and devils." Michael Servetus's writings also fall into a form of universalism in this period.

The period between the Reformation and the Age of Enlightenment featured extended debates about salvation and hell. The main controversy during this period was between the majority, who believed in the immortal soul and eternal punishment in hell (such as Calvin), and a minority, including Luther, who believed in soul sleep. Joachim Vadian and Johann Kessler accused the German Anabaptist Hans Denck of teaching universal salvation, but he denied it, and recent research suggests that he in fact did not teach it. Hans Hut was deeply influenced by Denck, but there is no evidence that he spread the doctrine of universalism.

17th century
The 17th century saw a resurgence of Christian universalism:
 Gerrard Winstanley, The Mysterie of God Concerning the Whole Creation, Mankinde (London, 1648).
 Richard Coppin, A hint of the glorious mysterie of the divine teachings (1649), defended at Worcester Assizes, 1652.
 Jane Leade, A Revelation of the Everlasting Gospel Message (1697).
 Jeremiah White, chaplain to Oliver Cromwell, wrote a book, The Restoration of all things, which was published posthumously in 1712 after his death in 1707.

Prominent universalists of this time also include the Cambridge Platonists in 17th-century England such as Peter Sterry.

The rise of ideological Calvinism, which taught that God neither sought out nor wanted salvation for all mankind and strictly held that divine omnipotence meant that God created those that he foresaw damnation for without mercy, fueled an intellectual counterreaction in which universalist-like doctrines that God intended all of humanity to be saved and will extend grace to most of humanity gained appeal. Arminianism and Quaker doctrine received much attention, but Christian universalism was still a fringe phenomenon in terms of scholarly thinking at the time.

18th century in Great Britain
George Whitfield, in a letter to John Wesley, wrote that Peter Boehler, a bishop in the Moravian Church, had privately confessed in a letter that "all the damned souls would hereafter be brought out of hell". William Law in An Humble, Earnest, and Affectionate Address to the Clergy (1761), an Anglican, and James Relly, a Welsh Methodist, were other significant 18th-century Protestant leaders who believed in Universalism.

In 1843, the Universalist Rev J. M. Day published an article "Was John Wesley a Restorationist?" in the Universalist Union magazine, suggesting that John Wesley (d. 1791) had made a private conversion to Universalism in his last years but had kept it secret. Biographers of Wesley reject that claim.

18th century in North America

Universalism was brought to the North American colonies in the early 18th century by the English-born physician George de Benneville, who was attracted by Pennsylvania's Quaker tolerance. North American universalism was active and organized. That was seen as a threat by the orthodox, Calvinist Congregationalists of New England such as Jonathan Edwards, who wrote prolifically against universalist teachings and preachers. John Murray (1741–1815) and Elhanan Winchester (1751–1797) are usually credited as founders of the modern Universalist movement and founding teachers of universal salvation. Early American Universalists such as Elhanan Winchester continued to preach the punishment of souls prior to eventual salvation.

19th century
The 19th century was the heyday of Christian universalism and the Universalist Church of America.

The famous German philosopher Friedrich Schleiermacher became one of the most well-known religious thinkers to teach universalism. Though he somewhat shared John Calvin's view of predestination, he interpreted the concept of an all-determining will of God to mean that through God's might, power, and foresight, humanity as a whole is fundamentally united in God's view and that every single person will eventually be drawn into his irresistible influence.

Other examples include English theologian Henry Bristow Wilson, who took somewhat of a universalist viewpoint in his part of the famous 1860 work Essays and Reviews and became condemned in the Court of Arches (an ecclesiastical court of the Church of England), only to soon receive vindication when the Lord Chancellor overturned that condemnation. Frederic Farrar's famous series of sermons in Westminster Abbey in 1877, published in print as Eternal Hope a year later, disputed the traditional views of damnation and punishment.

20th century
While highly influential Protestant theologians Karl Barth and Emil Brunner did not strictly identify as universalists, both wrote in detail about how they viewed complete salvation extended to every single member of mankind as being not just a distinct possibility as but something that should be hoped for by all Christians.

The Universalist Church of America merged with the American Unitarian Association in 1961 to form the Unitarian Universalists.

Hans Urs von Balthasar wrote a small book addressing the virtuous hope for universalism, as well as its origin in Origen, Dare We Hope "That All Men Be Saved"?. He also addressed the relationship between love and universalism in Love Alone is Credible.

Adolph E. Knoch and William Barclay were universalists. In 1919, the Swiss F. L. Alexandre Freytag led a breakaway group of the Bible Student movement.

Children's author Madeleine L'Engle (A Wrinkle in Time) was an advocate of universalism, which led several Christian retail outlets to refuse to stock her books.

21st century
Christian Universalism continues as an influence within not only Unitarian Universalism but also Trinitarian Universalism.

In 2004, the Pentecostal bishop Carlton Pearson received notoriety when he was officially declared a heretic by the Joint College of African-American Pentecostal Bishops. Bishop Pearson, who had attended Oral Roberts University, a Charismatic Christian college, formally declared his belief in the doctrine of universal salvation. His church, called the New Dimensions Church, adopted that doctrine (that is, those who remained, since a significant majority of the church's original membership left), and in 2008, the congregation was merged into All Souls Unitarian Church in Tulsa, Oklahoma, one of the largest Unitarian Universalist congregations in the world.

The Evangelical Universalist: The Biblical Hope That God's Love Will Save us All, by "Gregory MacDonald", was published in 2006. "Gregory MacDonald" is a pen name, and the book's author was later revealed to be Robin Parry. The same author is also a coeditor of a 2003 compilation, Universal Salvation? The Current Debate, and of a 2010 book, All Shall Be Well, which reviews the doctrine of universal salvation from Origen to Moltmann.

On May 17, 2007, the Christian Universalist Association was founded at the historic Universalist National Memorial Church in Washington, DC. That was a move to distinguish the modern Christian Universalist movement from Unitarian Universalism and to promote ecumenical unity among Christian believers in universal reconciliation.

In 2008, the Russian Orthodox scholar-bishop Hilarion Alfeyev of Volokolamsk, in his presentation at the First World Apostolic Congress of Divine Mercy (held in Rome in 2008), argued that God's mercy is so great that He does not condemn sinners to everlasting punishment. He said that the Orthodox understanding of Hell corresponds roughly to the Roman Catholic notion of purgatory. American Eastern Orthodox theologian David Bentley Hart has also argued for the coherence of the universalist position, most notably in That All Shall Be Saved: Heaven, Hell, and Universal Salvation (2019).

In her massive 2013 monograph The Christian Doctrine of Apokatastasis, A Critical Assessment from the New Testament to Eriugena, Ilaria L.E. Ramelli argues that apokatastasis (restoration) is a major patristic doctrine stemming from Greek philosophy and Jewish-Christian Scriptures. She makes the case for its presence and Christological and Biblical foundation in many Fathers, analysing its meaning and development from the birth of Christianity to Eriugena.

Contemporary Conservative Evangelical teachers of ultimate reconciliation include Thomas Talbott and J.D. Leavitt, founder of Heavenly Faith.

Two Christian theologians of the 20th and 21st centuries who wrote in support of universalism and have received major notice are also J.A.T. Robinson and John Hick. Both argued for universalism as coming from God's nature as being of omnipotent love and stated that as time went on after death, some would temporarily refuse to repent, but none would refuse to repent forever. Hick, in particular, stated that the seemingly contradictory nature of the Bible's references to damnation came about because the warnings of hell are conditional to warn men about eternal suffering if they permanently refuse to repent, but nobody would actually make that choice.

See also
Christian mysticism
Love of God
Panentheism
Philosophical theology
Restorative justice

References

Christian universalism
Christian terminology
Unitarian Universalism